The Buchan Express is a series of bus routes starting in Aberdeen. It is operated by Stagecoach Bluebird.

History 
The Buchan Express brand was introduced in 2015, coinciding with the introduction of 17 new Plaxton Elite-i vehicles. The routes previously operated under the Buchan Link brand. At this time, the routes were carrying around 25,000 people per week.

Between Mid 2020 and Late 2021, the 17 Elite-i coaches received a repaint into the new yellow Stagecoach long distance livery, previous these coaches had a purple, black and gold livery. YX65 ZKB (54242) was the first to be repainted after being off the road for a length of time after being involved in an RTC in late 2019 and YX65 ZKE (54245) was the last to be repainted having received its repaint in November 2021 .

Criticism 
The new coaches were criticised for multiple accessibility problems, despite meeting disability regulations. As a result, in 2017 the steps within the coaches were modified and additional bell pushes were added.

Routes

References 

Bus routes in Scotland
Stagecoach Group